Lehola is a settlement in Lääne-Harju Parish, Harju County in northwestern Estonia. It had the population of 486 (1 January 2004).

References 

Villages in Harju County